Vanak is a neighbourhood in the northern part of Tehran, capital of Iran.

Vanak may also refer to:
Vanak, Hormozgan, a village in Jask County, Hormozgan Province, Iran
Vanak, Isfahan, city in Semirom County, Isfahan Province, Iran
Vanak-e Olya, a village in Chadegan County, Isfahan Province, Iran
Vanak-e Sofla, a village in Chadegan County, Isfahan Province, Iran
Vanak, Markazi, a village in Komijan County, Markazi Province, Iran
Avanak, Alborz, village in Taleqan County, Alborz Province, Iran
Vanak Rural District, in Isfahan Province
John Vanak, American basketball referee
Michal Vanák (born 1986), Slovak footballer